The Electron Microscopy Center (abbr.: EMC) is a scientific user facility at Argonne National Laboratory.  The EMC works to solve materials problems using their unique capabilities for electron beam characterization.

Materials science organizations
Argonne National Laboratory